Marcelin is a village in the Canadian province of Saskatchewan within the Rural Municipality of Blaine Lake No. 434 and Census Division No. 16. It was named after the first postmaster Antoine Marcelin in 1904.

Marcelin is the administrative headquarters of the Muskeg Lake Cree First Nations band government. During World War II, the Muskeg Lake reserve had the highest rates of Indigenous enlistment in the country, and Mary Greyeyes became the first First Nations woman to enlist in the Canadian Forces.

History 
Marcelin incorporated as a village on September 25, 1911.

Demographics 

See also 

 List of communities in Saskatchewan
 Villages of Saskatchewan

References

External links

Villages in Saskatchewan
Blaine Lake No. 434, Saskatchewan
Division No. 16, Saskatchewan